The Namyangju massacre ( Hanja: 南楊州民間人虐殺 Namyangju civilian massacre) was a mass killing conducted by South Korean police and local militia forces between October 1950 and early 1951 in Namyangju, Gyeonggi-do district of South Korea. More than 460 people were summarily executed, including at least 23 children under the age of 10. After the victory of the Second Battle of Seoul, South Korean authorities arrested and summarily executed several individuals along with their families on suspicion of sympathizing with North Korea. During the massacre, South Korean Police conducted the Goyang Geumjeong Cave massacre in Goyang near Namyangju.

On 22 May 2008, the Truth and Reconciliation Commission demanded that the South Korean government apologize for the massacre and support a memorial service for the victims.

See also
Truth and Reconciliation Commission (South Korea)
Bodo League massacre
Jeju Uprising
Mungyeong massacre
Geochang massacre
List of massacres in South Korea

References

External links
Truth and Reconciliation Activities of the Past Three Years Truth and Reconciliation Commission, Republic of Korea

Massacres in South Korea
Political repression in South Korea
Police brutality in Asia
Namyangju
Mass murder in 1950
Mass murder in 1951
Korean War crimes
Massacres committed by South Korea
Political and cultural purges
South Korean war crimes
War crimes in South Korea
Military scandals
1950 in South Korea
1951 in South Korea
National law enforcement agencies of South Korea
Anti-communism in South Korea
1950 murders in South Korea
1951 murders in South Korea
Massacres in 1950
Massacres in 1951
History of Gyeonggi Province